Alapayevsky District is an administrative district (raion), one of the thirty in Sverdlovsk Oblast, Russia. As a municipal division, it is incorporated as Alapayevskoye Urban Okrug. It is located in the center of the oblast. Its administrative center is the town of Alapayevsk (which is not administratively a part of the district). Population: 33,613 (2010 Census);

Administrative and municipal status
Within the framework of administrative divisions, Alapayevsky District is one of the thirty in the oblast. The town of Alapayevsk serves as its administrative center, despite being incorporated separately as an administrative unit with the status equal to that of the districts.

As a municipal division, the district is incorporated as Alapayevskoye Urban Okrug. The Town of Alapayevsk is incorporated separately from the district as Alapayevsk Urban Okrug.

References

Notes

Sources

Districts of Sverdlovsk Oblast

